Dharmaram is a town in Dharmaram mandal of Peddapalli district in the Indian state of Telangana.

References 

Cities and towns in Peddapalli district